Kurdt Vanderhoof (born June 28, 1961) is an American guitarist, best known as the rhythm guitarist and founding member of the American heavy metal band Metal Church.

Biography 
As early as 1976, Vanderhoof was ardently networking with local musicians in his hometown of Aberdeen, Washington, and had formed a band called Tyr, which included Kirk Arrington on drums and Vanderhoof on rhythm guitar.  In 1978 he joined Seattle hardcore punk band The Lewd, adopting the stage name "Blobbo" and playing bass guitar, switching to guitar the following year. The Lewd relocated from Seattle to San Francisco in 1980. 

After his departure from The Lewd, Vanderhoof formed Metal Church, whose name was inspired by a nickname given to his San Francisco apartment. He later moved back to Aberdeen, with a vinyl single of "Kill Yourself" as proof of his time with the Lewd. 

In the summer of 1982, he formed a heavy metal cover band named Shrapnel. It consisted of Tom Weber on drums, Duke Erickson on bass (both from Hoquiam), Mike Murphey ("muff", from Montesano) and a guitar player Vanderhoof had jammed with at high school in Aberdeen. Shrapnel played four events to warm up, including a party at Pacific Lutheran University, after which the other guitar player quit, having had a religious experience and being unwilling to cover The Number of The Beast by Iron Maiden. His place was taken by Craig Wells of Aberdeen, and Weber was eventually replaced by Kirk Arrington (also from Hoquiam) on drums.  When Murphey left the band, they recruited David Wayne for vocal duties. By 1983, Shrapnel had renamed itself under Vanderhoof's original band name, Metal Church.

After Metal Church's second album The Dark in 1986, Vanderhoof left the band but nevertheless remained heavily involved in the songwriting process. He explained that he left the band to focus on learning "how to make records" from a production and engineering standpoint. 

Vanderhoof's first solo band was Hall Aflame, which released a single album before breaking up in 1994. Metal Church disbanded that same year. Vanderhoof later formed another solo band, Vanderhoof. This band released the albums Vanderhoof and A Blur in Time in 1997 and 2002 respectively. 

In 2005, Vanderhoof and several members from his solo band formed Presto Ballet, a band dedicated to recreating the progressive rock sounds of the mid 1970s. They released their debut album Peace Among the Ruins that same year, with Vanderhoof commenting: "We recorded the whole album in a somewhat 'old-school' manner, which means analogue synthesizers, real Hammond organ and real mellotron sounds".

References

1961 births
American heavy metal musicians
Living people
Metal Church members
Musicians from Washington (state)
People from Aberdeen, Washington
Rhythm guitarists